Shur Ab (also Romanized as Shūr Āb) is a village in Sojas Rud Rural District, Sojas Rud District, Khodabandeh County, Zanjan Province, Iran. At the 2006 census, its population was 301, in 68 families.

References 

Populated places in Khodabandeh County